World War II saw rapid technological innovation in response to the needs of the various combatants. Many different weapons systems evolved as a result.

Note: This list does not consist of all weapons used by all countries in World War II.

By country

List of World War II weapons of Australia
List of World War II weapons of Canada
List of World War II weapons of China
List of World War II weapons of Denmark
List of World War II weapons of Finland
List of World War II weapons of France
List of World War II weapons of Germany
List of World War II weapons of Greece
List of aircraft of Hungary in World War II
List of World War II weapons used in Ireland
List of World War II weapons of Italy
List of World War II weapons of Japan
List of World War II weapons of Norway
List of World War II weapons of Portugal
List of World War II weapons of Romania
List of World War II weapons of Switzerland
List of World War II weapons of the Soviet Union
List of World War II weapons of Thailand
List of World War II weapons of the United Kingdom
List of World War II weapons of the United States
Captured US firearms in Axis use in World War II
List of World War II weapons of Yugoslavia

See also
 List of World War II military equipment
 List of common World War II infantry weapons
 List of prototype World War II infantry weapons
 List of secondary and special-issue World War II infantry weapons
 German designations of foreign artillery in World War II
 German designations of foreign firearms in World War II

 
World War II weapons
Weapons